Walter E. Burkemo (October 9, 1918 – October 8, 1986) was an American professional golfer, best known for winning the PGA Championship in 1953.

Born in Detroit, Michigan, Burkemo was the youngest of 13 children of Norwegian immigrants who settled there. He began in golf at the age of 8 by caddying at Lochmoor Country Club in Detroit. Burkemo won his first title in 1938 at the Southern Florida Open; however, World War II intervened soon thereafter and he found himself drafted into the U.S. Army. Burkemo served in the infantry as a sergeant in the European Theater. He was seriously wounded twice, earning two Purple Hearts, the second time during the Battle of the Bulge.

Burkemo resumed his PGA Tour career after recovering from his injuries. He had little success in the late 1940s; but in 1951, his luck began to change when he won his first of four Michigan Opens. His best years in professional golf were in the early 1950s; he won the PGA Championship in 1953 and was runner-up in 1951 and 1954. Although he was one of the most consistent top-10 finishers on the tour, he would go on to win only one more event, the Mayfair Inn Open in 1957. He was a member of the Ryder Cup team in 1953.

The 1953 PGA Championship was played in July at Birmingham Country Club in Birmingham, Michigan, only six miles (10 km) from the Franklin Hills Country Club where Burkemo was club pro. He benefited from a so-called "home field advantage" because during the match play era, the PGA Championship was a marathon of double rounds for five straight days. The week began with 36 holes of qualifying on Wednesday and Thursday, followed by six matches – two rounds at 18 holes each on Friday and the last four rounds at 36 holes, concluding with the final on Tuesday. He also benefited from the fact that Ben Hogan, the reigning Masters and U.S. Open champion, was in Scotland to practice and qualify for the British Open, which started the day after the PGA Championship final match. In an era without any exemptions, the British Open's mandatory 36-hole qualifier immediately preceded the competition on Monday and Tuesday, during the semifinals and finals of the PGA. (After his automobile accident in 1949, Hogan did not enter the PGA Championship until 1960, then a stroke play event.) Burkemo's toughest match en route to the final against Felice Torza was in the semifinals against 1948 Masters champion Claude Harmon. Burkemo was 3 down after 11 holes but rallied and birdied the 36th hole to win 1 up.

After the 1954 season, Burkemo returned to life as a club pro because the grind of the PGA Tour was proving too difficult for him to maintain with a wife and four children. He continued to play the tour part-time for the rest of his career. He and his brother Vic opened Burkemo's driving range in St. Clair Shores.

Burkemo was inducted into the Michigan Sports Hall of Fame and the Michigan Golf Hall of Fame. He died in Fenton a day before his 68th birthday.

Professional wins (8)

PGA Tour wins (2)

Sources:

Other wins (6)
this list is probably incomplete
1938 Southern Florida Open
1951 Michigan Open
1955 Michigan Open, Michigan PGA Championship
1957 Michigan Open
1970 Michigan Open

Major championships

Wins (1)

Note: The PGA Championship was match play until 1958

Results timeline

Note: Burkemo never played in The Open Championship

WD = withdrew
CUT = missed the half-way cut
R64, R32, R16, QF, SF = Round in which player lost in PGA Championship match play
"T" indicates a tie for a place

Summary

Most consecutive cuts made – 6 (1951 PGA – 1954 Masters)
Longest streak of top-10s – 2 (1957 U.S. Open – 1957 PGA)

U.S. national team appearances
Ryder Cup: 1953 (winners)
Hopkins Trophy: 1954 (winners)

See also
List of men's major championships winning golfers

References

External links

American male golfers
PGA Tour golfers
Ryder Cup competitors for the United States
Winners of men's major golf championships
Golfers from Detroit
United States Army soldiers
United States Army personnel of World War II
American people of Norwegian descent
1918 births
1986 deaths